The Tun Razak Tower was a 35-storey office skyscraper located along Jalan Raja Laut in Kuala Lumpur, Malaysia, near the DBKL headquarters. The height of the building was 150 metres high.

It was built in 1983 and demolished in 2014. When it was demolished, it was the tallest building in Malaysia ever to be demolished.

Incidents
On 15 January 2014, a fire broke out at the 27th floor of the tower and reaching up to the 30th floor while the workers were cutting the air-conditioning ducts thus trapping them. It took a few hours for the flames to be doused by the firefighters. No casualties were reported but five workers were injured and later rushed to the Kuala Lumpur Hospital.

See also
 List of tallest voluntarily demolished buildings

References

Former skyscrapers
Skyscrapers in Kuala Lumpur
Office buildings completed in 1983
Buildings and structures demolished in 2014
Demolished buildings and structures in Malaysia
Skyscraper office buildings in Kuala Lumpur
20th-century architecture in Malaysia